The Youth Leadership Camp (YLC) is an annual four-week leadership program for deaf high school students which has been operating in the United States as a non-profit organization since the late 1960s. Youth Leadership Camp activities are conducted in American Sign Language.

History 
From July 27 to August 23, 1969, the first camp was held in Stroudsburg, Pennsylvania. Sixty-four freshmen and sophomore students attended.

From 2005 to the present, the camp has been at Camp Taloali in Stayton, Oregon. Camp Taloali is accredited by the American Camp Association and is associated with the Lions Club in the states of Oregon and Washington.

Past YLC Locations
 1969: Pine Lake Camp in Stroudsburg, Pennsylvania in The Poconos

 1970–1989: Swan Lake Lodge in Pengilly, Minnesota
 1990–2002: Camp Taloali in Stayton, Oregon
 2003: Camp Lakodia in Madison, South Dakota
 2004: Sertoma Camp Endeavor in Dundee, Florida near Winter Haven

See also
 PEN-International
 Project Insight

References

External links
 History of the Youth Leadership Camp

Deafness organizations
Year of establishment missing
Deaf culture in the United States
United States educational programs
Non-profit organizations based in the United States
Summer camps in the United States
Summer camps for children with special needs
Stayton, Oregon